The 2004 Major League Baseball All-Star Game was the 75th edition of the midseason exhibition baseball game between the all-stars of the American League (AL) and National League (NL), the two leagues comprising Major League Baseball. The game was held on July 13, 2004, at Minute Maid Park in Houston, Texas, the home of the Houston Astros of the National League. The game resulted in the American League defeating the National League 9–4, thus awarding the AL home-field advantage in the 2004 World Series.

Rosters
Players in italics have since been inducted into the National Baseball Hall of Fame.

American League

National League

Notes
 Player was selected to start, but did not play due to injury.
 Player was selected as a reserve, but became a starting replacement.
 Player was selected by the fans through the All-Star Final Vote.

Game

Umpires

Starting lineups

Game recap

National Anthems
The Canadian national anthem was sung by The Tragically Hip lead vocalist Gord Downie. The American national anthem was sung by American Idol Season 3 winner Fantasia Barrino.

Home Run Derby

Trivia
Jack McKeon became the oldest manager to manage an All-Star game after becoming the oldest manager to manage a World Series in 2003 with the Florida Marlins.
Roger Clemens gave up six runs in one inning for the first time in his major-league career.
In the top of the first inning, the American League hit for the cycle for the first time in All-Star Game history.
This was the first All-Star Game to be broadcast in high-definition.
This was also the first All-Star Game in which Joe Buck, the play-by-play announcer for Fox, announced the coaches, reserves, managers and starters for both the American League and National League.
Carlos Beltrán was originally selected to start in the outfield for the AL and represent the Kansas City Royals, but was traded to Houston a few weeks before this game, but still played in the game as a defensive substitution for Lance Berkman. Beltrán was on the roster because original starter Ken Griffey Jr. was hurt and Beltrán took his spot as a substitute.
This was also the last All-Star Game for Hall of Fame shortstop Barry Larkin, as he would retire before the 2005 season.
The day after hosting the game, the Astros fired manager Jimy Williams and replaced him with Phil Garner.

References

External links
 Game Recap

Major League Baseball All-Star Game
Major League Baseball All-Star Game
Baseball competitions in Houston
Major League Baseball All Star Game
2004 in Houston
July 2004 sports events in the United States